The following is the filmography of Indian television and film actress Ramya Krishnan. She has acted in Telugu, Tamil, Kannada, Malayalam, and Hindi films.

Telugu

Dubbing artist

Tamil

Kannada

Malayalam

Hindi

Television

Serials

Shows

Web series

References 

Indian filmographies
Actress filmographies